Andrea Traini (born August 23, 1992) is an Italian professional basketball player for Real Sebastiani Rieti of Italian Serie B Basket.

Traini spent the 2019-20 season with Basket Torino, averaging 4.9 points, 2.0 rebounds, and 2.0 assists per game. In 2020, he signed with Real Sebastiani Rieti and averaged 9.1 points, 4.6 assists, 4.0 rebounds, and 2.0 steals per game. Traini re-signed with the team on September 7, 2021.

International career

The Italian started in the under age categories of Italy, first for the Under 16's at the 2008 European Championship and then notably winning the silver medal with the U20's at the 2011 European Championship.
He also took part at the 2012 FIBA Europe Under-20 Championship.
In 2013 it was called up by the Senior's National Team  to take part at the 2013 Mediterranean Games, but he had to leave the team because of an injury.

Career statistics

Lega Basket Serie A

|-
| style="text-align:left;"| 2010–11
| style="text-align:left;"| Pesaro
| 21 || 0 || 6.7 || .393 || .315 || .863 || 1.0 || .2 || .4 || .0 || 2.4
|-
| style="text-align:left;"| 2011–12
| style="text-align:left;"| Pesaro
| 7 || 0 || 2.8 || .333 || .250 || .0 || .1 || .0 || .0 || .0 || 0.7
|-
| style="text-align:left;"| 2012–13
| style="text-align:left;"| Pesaro
| 8 || 0 || 14.1 || .448 || .437 || .900 || 1.8 || .7 || 1 || .0 || 6.3
|- class="sortbottom"
| style="text-align:left;"| Career
| style="text-align:left;"|
| 36 || 0 || 7.6 || .411 || .359 || .881 || 1.0 || .3 || .4 || .0 || 2.9

Honours

Team

International
European Under-20 Championship
2011 Bilbao

References

External links
 Andrea Traini at draftexpress.com
 Andrea Traini at FIBA.com.
 Andrea Traini at legabasket.it 

1992 births
Living people
Basket Brescia Leonessa players
Italian men's basketball players
Lega Basket Serie A players
Sportspeople from the Province of Ancona
Point guards
Victoria Libertas Pallacanestro players
Basket Torino players